The Hindu Marriage Act is an Act of the Parliament of India enacted in 1955 which was passed on 18th of May. Three other important acts were also enacted as part of the Hindu Code Bills during this time: the Hindu Succession Act (1956), the Hindu Minority and Guardianship Act (1956), the Hindu Adoptions and Maintenance Act (1956).

Purpose
The main purpose of the act was to amend and codify the law relating to marriage among Hindus and others. Besides amending and codifying Sastrik Law, it also included separation and divorce, which also exist in Sastrik Law. This enactment brought uniformity of law for all sections of Hindus. In India there are religion-specific civil codes that separately govern adherents of certain other religions.

Applicability
Section 2  of the Hindu Marriage Act, 1955 says:

 This Act applies -
to any person who is a Hindu by religion in any of its forms or developments, including a Virashaiva, a Lingayat or a follower of the Brahmo, Prarthana or Arya Samaj; 
to any person who is a Buddhist, Jain or Sikh by religion; and
to any other person domiciled in the territories to which this Act extends who is not a Muslim, Christian, Parsi or Jew by religion, unless it is proved that any such person would not have been governed by the Hindu law or by any custom or usage as part of that law in respect of any of the matters dealt with herein if this Act had not been passed.

This section therefore applies to Hindus by religion in any of its forms and Hindus within the extended meaning i.e. Buddhist, Jains or Sikh and, in fact, applies to all such persons domiciled in the country who are not Muslims, Christians, Parsi or Jew, unless it is proved that such persons are not governed by the Act under any custom or usage. The Act applies to Hindus outside the territory of India only if such a Hindu is domiciled in the territory of India.

The Act was viewed as conservative because it applied to any person who is Hindu by religion in any of its forms, yet groups other religions into the act (Jains, Buddhists, or Sikhs) as specified in Article 44 of the Indian Constitution. However, with the passage of Anand Marriage (Amendment) Bill in 2012, Sikhs now also have their own personal law related to marriage.

A marriage is directly registered by the Registrar of Marriage under section 8 of Hindu Marriage Act-1955 on the same working day. Verification of all the documents is carried out on the date of application and thereafter Marriage is registered on the same working day by the registrar of marriage appointed by the Govt. of India and marriage certificate is issued.

Hindu view of marriage
According to Hinduism, marriage is a sacred relationship. In some Hindu systems of marriage, there is no role for the state as marriage remained a private affair within the social realm. Within this traditional framework reference, marriage is undoubtedly the most important transitional point in a Hindu's life and the most important of all the Hindu "sanskaras" (life-cycle rituals).
The Congress Government diluted the Hindu Marriage in 1955 by enactment of HMA and then in 1983 by introduction of 498A. Special Marriage Act in 2000. 
Therefore there was fierce religious opposition to enacting such laws for marriage, succession and adoption. The greatest opposition was to the provision of divorce, something which is anathema to the Hindu religion. Also resisted was the principle of equal inheritance by sons and daughters regardless of whether the daughter was married or unwed. This was contrary to the Hindu view of family, where married daughters were regarded as belonging to the family of their husband, not to the family of their father.

Some have argued that Hindu marriage cannot be subjected to legislative intervention. Derrett predicted in his later writings that despite some evidence of modernisation, the dominant view in Hindu society for the foreseeable future would remain that marriage is a form of social obligation.

Conditions
Section 5 of Hindu Marriage Act, 1955 states:-

"Section 5. A marriage may be solemnised between any two Hindus, if the following conditions are fulfilled, namely-
neither party has a spouse living at the time of the marriage
at the time of the marriage, neither party-
is incapable of giving a valid consent to it in consequence of unsoundness of mind; or
<li>though capable of giving a valid consent, has been suffering from mental disorder of such a kind or to such an extent as to be unfit for marriage and the procreation of children;
the bridegroom has completed the age of twenty-one years at the time of the marriage;
the parties are not within the degrees of prohibited relationship unless the custom or usage governing each of them permits of a marriage between the two;
the parties are not sapindas of each other, unless the custom or usage governing each of them permits of a marriage between the two."

Guardianship
Section 6 of the Hindu Marriage Act specifies the guardianship for marriage. Wherever the consent of a guardian in marriage is necessary for a bride under this Act, the persons entitled to give such consent are the following: the father; the mother; the paternal grandfather; the paternal grandmother; the brother by full blood; the brother by half blood; etc. The Guardianship For Marriage was repealed in 1978 after the Child Marriage Restraint Amendment was passed. This was an amendment that increased the minimum age requirement for marriage in order to prevent child marriages.

Section
Section 7 of the Hindu Marriage Act recognises the ceremonies and customs of marriage.  Hindu marriage may be solemnised in accordance with the customary rites and ceremonies of either party.  Such rites and rituals include the Saptapadi—the taking of seven steps by the bridegroom and the bride jointly before the sacred fire.  The marriage becomes complete and binding when the seventh step is taken.

Registration
As stated in Section 8 of the Act, the state government may make rules for the registration of Hindu marriages that the parties to any of such marriages may have particulars relating to their marriages entered in such a manner and subject to such conditions as may be prescribed in the Hindu Marriage Register. This registration is for the purpose of facilitating the proof of Hindu marriages. All rules made in this section may be laid before the state legislature. The Hindu Marriage Register should be open for inspection at all reasonable times and should be admissible as evidence of the statements contained therein.

Nullity of marriage and divorce
Any marriage can be voidable and may be annulled on the following grounds: the marriage has not been consummated due to impotency, may be complete or partial impotency (for example conditions such as impotence quoad hoc), contravention of the valid consent mental illness condition specified in Section 5, or that the respondent at the time of the marriage was pregnant by someone other than the petitioner. Divorce can be sought by husband or wife on certain grounds, including:  continuous period of desertion for two or more years, conversion to a religion other than Hindu, mental abnormality, venereal disease, and leprosy. A wife can also present a petition for the dissolution of marriage on the ground of  if the husband marries again after the commencement of his first marriage or if the husband has been guilty of rape, sodomy, or bestiality. Newly married couples cannot file a petition for divorce within one year of marriage.

Marriage Laws (Amendment) Bill, 2010
Based on recommendations of the Law Commission, a legislation was proposed. The Marriage Laws (Amendment) Bill, 2010 to amend the Hindu Marriage Act, 1955 and the Special Marriage Act, 1954 to making divorce easier on ground of irretrievable breakdown of marriage was introduced in the parliament in 2012. The Bill replaces the words "not earlier than six months" in Section 13-B with the words "Upon receipt of a petition."

It also provides a better safeguard to wives by inserting section 13D by which the wife may oppose the grant of a decree on the ground that the dissolution of the marriage will result in grave financial hardship to her and that it would in all the circumstances be wrong to dissolve the marriage.

New section 13E provides restriction on decree for divorce affecting children born out of wedlock and states that a court shall not pass a decree of divorce under section 13C unless the court is satisfied that adequate provision for the maintenance of children born out of the marriage has been made consistently with the financial capacity of the parties to the marriage.

Marriage Laws (Amendment) Bill, 2010 makes similar amendments to the Special Marriage Act, 1954 by replacing the words "not earlier than six months" in Section 28 with the words "Upon receipt of a petition" and provides restriction on decree for divorce affecting children born out of wedlock.

However, there was opposition to this bill due to the objection that it will create hardships for women and that the bill strongly supports one party while both parties should be treated equal in divorce. Therefore, the bill was amended to provide for the wife's consent for waiver of six-month notice with the words "Upon receipt of petitions by the husband and the wife."

The Bill was passed by the Rajya Sabha in 2013, though it was not passed in the Lok Sabha.

Protest against the bill came from Men's rights movement groups. Hridaya, a Kolkata-based NGO, demonstrated against the bill. Amartya Talukdar (a Men's Right Activist) raised concern that the bill introduces no-fault divorce for Hindus only. According to him, "If the Government really wants to bring about empowerment of women, let them make it open for all sections of the society. Let them bring a uniform civil code. Why is it only for the Hindus?"

Judicial review

P.Sivakumar vs S.Beula 
https://indiankanoon.org/doc/53788682/

Devinder Singh Narula vs Meenakshi Nangia 
The Supreme Court of India exercised its powers under Article 142 of the Constitution of India and ruled in August 2012 that marriages can be ended by mutual consent before expiry of the cooling period of six months stipulated in the Hindu Marriage Act, 1955. Section 13-B of the Hindu Marriage Act provides for the couple seeking divorce through mutual consent to wait for a period of six months after making first joint application for divorce. It is only after the expiry of the six months that the couple can move second application for the dissolution of their marriage.

Pronouncing the judgment, Justice Altamas Kabir said: "It is no doubt true that the legislature had in its wisdom stipulated a cooling period of six months from the date of filing of a petition for mutual divorce till such divorce is actually granted, with the intention that it would save the institution of marriage. But there may be occasions when in order to do complete justice to the parties it becomes necessary for this court to invoke its powers under Article 142 in an irreconcilable situation (between the couple). When it has not been possible for the parties to live together and to discharge their marital obligations towards each other for more than one year, we see no reason to continue the agony of the parties for another two months."

Arun Kumar v. Inspector General of Registration 

A case before the Madras High Court opinioned same-sex marriage within historical Hinduism, that homosexual acts are not forbidden under the Act, and that marriage is a fundamental constitutional right. If literally interpreted, the terms "groom" and "bride" may be viewed as referring to narrow definitions based on genders ("male" and "female"). However, the Hindu Marriage Act was a codification of the ancient Sastrik law by the colonial government for the purpose of regulating issues such as divorce. Application of the "mischief rule" in this situation allows homosexual marriage to be allowed under the current reading of the Hindu Marriage Act, as what "the statute aims at relieving is the regulation of marriage, and not that two same-sex individuals could marry each other. The Act is a codifying statute, and not a penal or disabling statute" and that it was improperly codified.

Supriyo v. Union of India 

In August 2022 the Supreme Court of India provided live-in couples including homosexual couples with equal rights to married couples. This offers some semblance of equality in a country where the vast majority of Hindu marriages are not registered with government.

There are currently around six petitions pending at the High Court of Delhi asking for recognition of their marriages under the Hindu Marriage Act. The verdict will be delivered on the 24th April 2023.

See also

 The Prohibition of Child Marriage Act, 2006
 Samskara (rite of passage)
 Dowry system in India
 Muslim Women (Protection of Rights on Divorce) Act 1986
 Christian personal law
 Gullipilli Sowria Raj v. Bandaru Pavani

References

External links

H.M.A (Mobile Friendly)
 PDF file of the Hindu Marriage Act
 Marriage Laws (Amendment) Bill, 2010
 Marriage Laws (Amendment), Divorce
 Rajya Sabha approves bill to make divorce friendly for women

Hindu law
Marriage in Hinduism
Indian family law
Nehru administration
Acts of the Parliament of India 1955
Marriage law in India
[[Category:Divorce in India]]
Law of India